Bellambi railway station is located on the South Coast railway line in New South Wales, Australia, serving the northern Wollongong suburb of Bellambi. It opened in 1889.

Platforms & services
Bellambi has one island platform with two faces serviced by NSW TrainLink South Coast line services travelling from Waterfall and Thirroul to Port Kembla. Some peak hour and late night services operate to Sydney Central, Bondi Junction and Kiama.

References

External links

Belambi station details Transport for New South Wales

Buildings and structures in Wollongong
Railway stations in Australia opened in 1889
Regional railway stations in New South Wales
Short-platform railway stations in New South Wales, 6 cars